Andraž Bedene (born 18 July 1989) is a Slovenian tennis player.

Bedene has a career high ATP singles ranking of 840 achieved on 5 December 2011. He also has a career high ATP doubles ranking of 818 achieved on 31 August 2009.

Bedene made his ATP main draw debut at the 2011 ATP Studena Croatia Open in the doubles draw partnering his twin brother Aljaž Bedene.

External links
 
 

1989 births
Living people
Slovenian male tennis players
Sportspeople from Ljubljana
Slovenian twins